Nacoleia sorosi is a moth in the family Crambidae. It was described by Valentina A. Kirpichnikova in 1999. It is found in Primorsky Krai in the Russian Far East.

References

Moths described in 1999
Nacoleia
Moths of Asia